Aradinae is a subfamily of true bugs in the family Aradidae. There are at least 90 described species in Aradinae.

Genus
 Aradus Fabricius, 1803

References

 Thomas J. Henry, Richard C. Froeschner. (1988). Catalog of the Heteroptera, True Bugs of Canada and the Continental United States. Brill Academic Publishers.

Further reading

 

Aradoidea